This is a list of Xbox One games planned or released either at retail or via download. There are currently  games on both parts of this list.

List of games from letter A to L

List of games from letter M to Z

See also
 List of best-selling Xbox One video games
 List of compatible titles from Xbox
 List of backward-compatible games for Xbox One and Series X/S
 List of Xbox One X enhanced games
 List of Xbox One applications
 List of Xbox Live games on Windows 10

Notes

Xbox One